Nicolás González Casares is a Spanish nurse and politician who was elected as a Member of the European Parliament in 2019.

Political career
In parliament, González Casares serves on the Committee on Industry, Research and Energy. In 2020, he joined the Special Committee on Beating Cancer. 

In addition to his committee assignments, González Casares is part of the parliament’s delegation for relations with Japan. He is also a member of the Spinelli Group and the European Parliament Intergroup on Artificial Intelligence and Digital.

References

Living people
MEPs for Spain 2019–2024
Spanish Socialist Workers' Party MEPs
Year of birth missing (living people)